Henry Bertram (1825–1878) was a US general.

Henry Bertram may also refer to:

Henry Bertram, character in Guy Mannering
Henry Bertram, owner of Henry Bertram, Sr. House on National Register of Historic Places listings in Yamhill County, Oregon
Henry Bertram, Gestapo officer, see Sund, Norway

See also
Henry Bertram Price (1869–1941), Governor of Guam
Harry Bertram (disambiguation)